, also known as  before the 18th century, located in the north of Okinawa Island, was one of three independent political entities which controlled Okinawa in the 14th century during Sanzan period. The political entity was identified as a tiny country, a kingdom, or a principality by modern historians, however the ruler of Hokuzan was in fact not "kings" at all, but petty lords with their own retainers owing their direct service, and their own estates.

Okinawa, previously controlled by a number of local chieftains or lords, loosely bound by a paramount chieftain or king of the entire island, split into these three more solidly defined kingdoms within a few years after 1314; the Sanzan period thus began, and would end roughly one hundred years later, when Chūzan's King Shō Hashi conquered Hokuzan in 1416 and Nanzan in 1429.

After the unification of Ryukyu, Hokuzan became one of three nominal fu (lit. "prefectures") of the Ryukyu Kingdom without administrative function.

History

Sanzan period: "King of Sanhoku"

Hokuzan first came into being in 1314 when Tamagusuku inherited the role of head chieftain of all of Okinawa from his father Eiji. He did not have the charisma or leadership qualities to command the loyalty of all the local lords, and so the Lord of Nakijin, one of many powerful local chieftains, decamped north with a number of lesser chieftains loyal to him and established himself in Nakijin Castle. Another powerful chieftain relocated into the south and established the kingdom of Nanzan, leaving Tamagusuku in control only of the central part of the island, which thus became the kingdom of Chūzan.

Though Hokuzan was the largest of the three kingdoms, it was also the poorest and the most sparsely populated. Much of its land was wild, and its few farming or fishing villages were more primitive than those of the other two kingdoms. Nakijin Castle (城 gusuku) stood on an outcropping of the Motobu Peninsula, with drops of varying steepness on every side; the ruins which remain today indicate the development of a community of fair size around it, including residences for the king's vassals, and three shrines (拝所 uganju) to the native religion within the castle walls.

In addition to its deficiencies in agriculture and fishing, Hokuzan suffered from the disadvantage, relative to Chūzan, of holding no port to equal Naha (O. Naafa). A small junk trade used the inlet below the castle's promontory as a dock, and later Unten harbor. Nevertheless, the northern kingdom engaged in its share of trade with many of the other states in the region, including Java, Sumatra, and the Ayutthaya Kingdom of Siam. Chūzan entered a tributary relationship with Ming dynasty China in 1372, and Hokuzan and Nanzan were granted similar commercial status shortly afterwards.

Over roughly the next thirty years, only nine tribute missions were sent from Hokuzan to China; Nanzan sent nineteen and Chūzan sent fifty-two. Hokuzan also did not send any students to China, as Chūzan did.

Roughly twenty years later, in the 1390s, the kings of all three kingdoms died within a few years, and succession disputes erupted across the island; similar events occurred in Nanking at the same time, with the death of the Hongwu Emperor in 1398. Previously, China had only ever recognized one head of state on Okinawa, but now all three kingdoms sent envoys and vied for the prestige, wealth, and power that would come with China's favor; no response came from China for eleven years. In 1406, Bunei, King of Chūzan, was formally invested by representatives of the Ming Court in his position; the kings of Hokuzan would never enjoy this privilege.

Despite its economic and political advantages, Hokuzan posed a not insignificant threat to Chūzan, militarily, since its establishment. In the 1410s, however, disputes among the vassals of Hokuzan's king weakened the kingdom, and in 1416, Chūzan found an opportunity to strike after three of those vassals (anji) defected. Following a fierce defense, Nakijin castle fell, and the king and his closest vassals committed suicide.

After the unification: Hokuzan-fu
The post was abolished by Shō Shitsu in 1665, the last warden was ordered to move to Shuri.

During the Ryukyu Kingdom period, Hokuzan was one of three nominal  of the kingdom without administrative function. At the end of the 17th century, Sanhoku nominally comprised 9 : Onna, Kin, Kushi, Nago, Haneji, Motobu, Nakijin, Ōgimi, and Kunigami.

During King Shō Kei's reign, someone suggested that the capital should be moved to Nago. It was disapproved by the regent Sai On, finally, the capital was remained in Shuri. Also in the same period, the name "Sanhoku" (山北) was changed into "Hokuzan" (北山).

Rulers of Hokuzan

See also
 Ryukyuan missions to Imperial China
 Ryukyu Kingdom
 Imperial Chinese missions to the Ryukyu Kingdom
 List of monarchs of the Ryukyu Islands

Notes

References

Citations

Sources 

 Kerr, George H. (2000). Okinawa: the History of an Island People. (revised ed.) Boston: Tuttle Publishing.

1416 disestablishments
States and territories established in 1314
Ryukyu Kingdom
Ryukyu Islands
Former kingdoms